Duncan Alexander Goodhew,  (born 27 May 1957) is an English former competitive swimmer. After swimming competitively in America as a collegian at North Carolina State University, he was an Olympic swimmer for Great Britain and won Olympic gold and bronze medals at the 1980 Summer Olympics in Moscow. He also swam at the 1976 Summer Olympics.

Early life
Goodhew attended Windlesham House School and Millfield School (Walton House).

He was diagnosed with dyslexia at the age of 13.

At the age of 15, he fell out of a tree, which triggered permanent hair loss due to alopecia universalis.

Career
Goodhew came to prominence as an international swimmer in 1976, finishing 7th in the 100m breaststroke at the Montreal Olympics that summer. Four years later, in the 1980 Moscow Olympics, he won gold in the 100m breaststroke, in a time of 1:03.34, and a bronze in the 4x100m medley relay. He represented England and won three silver medals in the breaststroke events and medley relay, at the 1978 Commonwealth Games in Edmonton, Alberta, Canada. At the ASA National British Championships he won the 100 metres breaststroke title in 1976, 1978 and 1980 and the 200 metres breaststroke title in 1976, 1978 and 1980.

Goodhew was selected by the British Bobsleigh Association to represent Great Britain at the 1981 European Championships.

He is also an author and motivational speaker. In 1983 he was appointed an MBE by Queen Elizabeth II for services to sport. In 1987 he participated in Prince Edward's charity television special The Grand Knockout Tournament.

Goodhew's 100m breaststroke gold medal achievement was ranked 99th in the British network Channel 4's 100 Greatest Sporting Moments in 2002.

On 29 September 2001, Goodhew participated in an international relay off the coast of California from Santa Catalina Island to Santa Monica. Of the eight international relay teams participating, each team had one swimmer with MS. Goodhew swam on the same team as organizer and MS activist Taylor MH. Proceeds from fund-raising were all donated to the Myelin Project.

Goodhew has made a number of television appearances including featuring in several episodes of Dave Gorman's Important Astrology Experiment.

Personal life
Goodhew married Annie Patterson, an American graphic designer from North Carolina, in December 1984, and they have two children.

In 2000, Labour MP Robert Sheldon collapsed in the street and was revived by mouth-to-mouth resuscitation by Goodhew who happened to be passing.

See also
 List of Commonwealth Games medallists in swimming (men)
 List of Olympic medalists in swimming (men)

References

1957 births
Living people
English male swimmers
Male breaststroke swimmers
English expatriate sportspeople in the United States
People educated at Millfield
Swimmers at the 1976 Summer Olympics
Swimmers at the 1980 Summer Olympics
English Olympic medallists
Olympic swimmers of Great Britain
Olympic gold medallists for Great Britain
Olympic bronze medallists for Great Britain
People educated at Windlesham House School
Swimmers at the 1978 Commonwealth Games
Commonwealth Games silver medallists for England
Members of the Order of the British Empire
NC State Wolfpack men's swimmers
Olympic bronze medalists in swimming
World Aquatics Championships medalists in swimming
European Aquatics Championships medalists in swimming
Medalists at the 1980 Summer Olympics
Olympic gold medalists in swimming
Commonwealth Games medallists in swimming
Universiade medalists in swimming
Universiade silver medalists for Great Britain
Medalists at the 1977 Summer Universiade
People with alopecia universalis
Medallists at the 1978 Commonwealth Games